Prisoners is the third studio album by Canadian metal band the Agonist. It was released on June 4 in Europe and June 5, 2012 in North America via Century Media records and was produced by the band's longtime producer Christian Donaldson. "Ideomotor" has been confirmed as the first single. The album sold 1,400 copies in the United States in the first week of its release and debuted at No. 19 on the Top New Artist Albums (Heatseekers) chart. This is the last album with original singer Alissa White-Gluz before she joined Arch Enemy in 2014.

Style
About.com's Dan Marsicano described the album as a "focused blend of strait-laced metalcore and technical craftsmanship that borders on the progressive front" and Sputnik Music wrote that the album is "oozing with inspiration from a plethora of genres, such as melodeath, thrash and progressive metal."

Critical reception
In a review for AllMusic, critic reviewer Eduardo Rivadavia explained: "Although its explosively schizophrenic amalgam of disparate sounds, moods, and intensities might initially suggest otherwise, the Agonist's third album, Prisoners, is in fact an apt summation of that which came before it; a mature, calculated freakout representing the latest sprint in the Canadian band's aggressive evolutionary curve, well beyond the modest metalcore roots. At About.com, Dan Marsicano wrote: "Prisoners is a much tamer album than Lullabies for the Dormant Mind, with less additional instrumentation, but is just a smidgen better due to the combined effort of each member."

Track listing

Personnel

The Agonist
Alissa White-Gluz – lead vocals, lyrics
Danny Marino – lead guitar, additional acoustic guitar in "Dead Ocean"
Pascal "Paco" Jobin – rhythm guitar, additional acoustic guitar in "Dead Ocean"
Chris Kells – bass, backing vocals
Simon McKay – drums, percussion

Production
Christian Donaldson – producer
Tue Madsen – mixing

Charts

References

External links
 Official Facebook Page
 Century Media Profile Page

2012 albums
Century Media Records albums
The Agonist albums